Louis Landon is a composer, Steinway Artist, solo pianist for peace, singer-songwriter, recording artist, and touring musician from New York City, currently residing in Sedona, AZ. He toured and recorded with renowned musician John Payne as a member of the John Payne Band. He has performed and toured with Mikhail Baryshnikov, John Payne, Rupert Holmes, John Hall, and Pucho & His Latin Soul Brothers.

Early years
Louis Landon was born in Yonkers, New York and his family relocated to Studio City, California in 1960. Landon's father, Leo De Lyon, is the voice actor best known as Brain and Spook in the popular television cartoon, Top Cat.

Louis began playing piano at age five and played classical compositions. Shortly afterward his parents got him piano lessons.

In the early 1970s, Landon transferred from Stony Brook University to Berklee College of Music in Boston, Massachusetts.
Landon pursued studies in jazz while attending Berklee College of Music.

While playing in and around Boston, Landon met saxophonist, John Payne.

John Payne Band
Landon toured with the John Payne Band for three years from 1974 to 1977 and during that time recorded four albums. The John Payne band incorporated a jazz fusion style into their sound and opened for Weather Report, The Tony Williams Lifetime, John McLaughlin.

The self-titled debut LP, John Payne's First Album, was released in 1975 on Payne's own independent label, Bromfield Records. Landon contributed two original songs for the album.

The follow up album, Bedtime Stories, was released in 1976 on Arista/Freedom. Landon contributed much of the original song writing for the album.

In 1977, the band released two albums, The Razor's Edge, on Arista/Freedom and John Payne/Louis Levin Band on Mercury Records.

Nightfire
Landon left Boston for Manhattan where he formed a jazz fusion band called Nightfire. Until the late 1970s, Landon did studio work and freelanced around New York City.

During the late 1970s, Landon auditioned for and landed the position of keyboard player for the John Hall band.

John Hall Band and touring
Landon appeared on Hall's LP, Power, on Columbia Records. Subsequently, he began touring with Rupert Holmes, the composer of the pop hit, "Escape (The Pina Colada Song)".

Landon toured extensively during the course of the next few years across the country with Hall and Holmes.

No Nukes
In September 1979, Landon performed at the Musicians United for Safe Energy collective sponsored "No Nukes": The Muse Concerts For A Non-Nuclear Future concert with fellow performers including: The Doobie Brothers, Bonnie Raitt and John Hall. There was a triple live album released in 1980 that Landon is credited on as a Keyboard player.

Special Thanks
Landon's personal journals from 1995 through 2006, document the working relationship and friendship he developed with Gavin Degraw during the early days and rise of his career. In the special thanks section of Degraw's album, Chariot, Landon is listed in the credits.

Awards and honors
"Departure - Solo Piano," was nominated for album of the year in 2016 on Whisperings Solo Piano Radio. "Healing Hearts 2 - solo piano" was voted Album of the Year 2016 at solo piano.com".  Peaceful Christmas - Solo Piano," was nominated for Best Holiday Album 2012 at Zone Music Reporter. "Solo Piano For Love, Peace & Mermaids," was nominated for album of the year in 2010 on Whisperings Solo Piano Radio. "Seattle Morning", is featured on a Whisperings compilation called Whisperings Solo Piano Volume 1.

Discography
 Love Songs and Jazz (1994)
 Joyous Spirit (I) (1997)
 Feel This (1999)
 Joyous Spirit (II) (2000)
 The Gershwins, Cole Porter & Me (2004)
 unwind (2005)
 Peace Revolution (2007)
 Solo Piano For Peace (2009)
 Solo Piano For Love, Peace, and Mermaids (2010)
 Peaceful Christmas - Solo Piano (2010)
 Peaceful Solo Piano from the Heart (2011)
 Ten Years - A Peaceful Solo Piano Retrospective  (2012)
 Sedona on My Mind  (2013)
 Healing Piano of Sedona for Massage, Yoga & Relaxation  (2014)
 Healing Hearts - solo piano  (2014)
 Walking the Plains & Other Solo Piano Stories  (2015)
 Healing Hearts 2 - solo piano (2015)
 Whispers of Grace (2015)
 Healing Hearts 3 - solo piano  (2016)
 Ebb and Flow - solo piano  (2016)
 Soul Healing Piano Music  (2017)
 Departure - solo piano  (2017)
 Classic Pop Rock Solo Piano  (2017)
 Peaceful Solo Piano Christmas 2  (2017)
 Looking Beyond the Mirror  (2017)
 Keys for Peace - Solo Piano  (2018)
 Solo Piano Fantasies  (2018)
 Healing Hearts 4 - Solo Piano  (2018)
 Five Years of Sedona Solo Piano  (2018)
 Solo Piano Gratitude  (2019)
 Heartfelt Solo Piano Gratitude  (2019)
 Solo Piano Space Traveler  (2019)
 Solo Piano Reverence  (2019)
 Southwest Solo Piano  (2020)
 Thanksgiving Piano  (2020)
 Panama Piano  (2020)
 Feel Good Piano  (2020)
 Provocative Piano  (2021)
 Nighttime Piano for Relaxation and Deep Sleep  (2021)

External links 
Louis Landon Official Website
Louis Landon on Pandora Radio
Louis Landon on the Steinway website
Oovra Music licenses Louis Landon's music
Louis Landon on Spotify
Louis Landon on iTunes
Louis Landon on Amazon
Louis Landon on Bandcamp
Louis Landon on YouTube
Louis Landon on solopiano.com
Louis Landon on mainlypiano.com

References 

American singer-songwriters
American male singer-songwriters
Living people
Year of birth missing (living people)
People from Studio City, Los Angeles
American male pianists
21st-century American pianists
21st-century American male musicians